Arthur Locker (1828–1893) was an English novelist and journalist.

Life
The second son of Edward Hawke Locker, he was born at Greenwich on 2 July 1828; Frederick Locker-Lampson was his brother. He was educated at Charterhouse School and Pembroke College, Oxford, where he matriculated on 6 May 1847, and graduated B.A. in 1851.

Locker went into commerce in a Liverpool office. Attracted by the Australian Gold Rush of the time, he emigrated to Victoria, and there took up journalism and writing. He returned to the UK in 1861, where he wrote extensively for newspapers and magazines.

In 1863 Locker obtained work with The Times, which lasted until 1870, when he was appointed editor of The Graphic a few months after it was founded. He brought on young writers.

In December 1891 poor health saw Locker retire. After visiting Madeira and the Isle of Wight, he died at 79 West Hill, Highgate, London, on 23 June 1893.  He was twice married, to Mary Jane Rouse and after her death to Catharine Sarah Carpenter née Clulioth.

Works
Locker published fiction, mainly based on his Australian experiences:

 Sweet Seventeen, 1866; 
 On a Coral Reef, juvenile literature, 1869; 
 Stephen Scudamore the Younger, 1871,
 The Village Surgeon, 1874.

Notes

Attribution

1828 births
1893 deaths
People educated at Charterhouse School
Alumni of Pembroke College, Oxford
English male novelists
English newspaper editors
English male journalists